Raj Bahadur (1912–1990) He was the leader of the Indian National Congress, who was elected a member of the Constituent Assembly of India from the state of Rajasthan.  After independence, he became the first tourism minister of India.

Career
He was three times elected to Lok Sabha from Bharatpur (Lok Sabha constituency).  He also served as Minister of Telecommunications for year 1956 – 57.
He was elected to Rajasthan Legislative Assembly from Bharatpur in 1980. 
Raj Bahadur also served as India's ambassador to Nepal.

He died  on 22 September 1990 in New Delhi.

References

External links
 Raj Bahadur bioprofile

Rajasthani politicians
Rajasthani people
1912 births
1990 deaths
Ambassadors of India to Nepal
People from Bharatpur district
Members of the Constituent Assembly of India
Members of the Cabinet of India
India MPs 1957–1962
India MPs 1962–1967
India MPs 1971–1977
Lok Sabha members from Rajasthan
Civil aviation ministers of India
India MPs 1952–1957
People from Dausa district
Tourism ministers of India
Indian National Congress politicians from Rajasthan